Idhayaththil Oru Idam is a 1980 Indian Tamil-language film, directed by Prasath for Sree Hariram Movies. The film stars Srikanth and Raadhika.

Plot

Cast 

Srikanth
Raadhika

Soundtrack 
The music for this film was composed by Ilaiyaraaja.

References

External links 

 

1980 films
Films scored by Ilaiyaraaja
1980s Tamil-language films